El Rancho Hotel, Gallup, New Mexico, is a historic hotel built by R.E. “Griff” Griffith, the brother of film director D.W. Griffith. The pair encouraged early film production in the surrounding area. It is located on old U.S. Route 66 and became the temporary home for many Hollywood movie stars.The rambling, three-story hotel building has a large portico with a central balcony reminiscent of the Southern Plantation style. The National Park Service describes it as having a “rusticated fantasy appearance.” Materials include brick, random ashlar stone, and roughewn wood with a wood shake roof and brick and stone chimneys. The lobby features a spectacular walk-in fireplace made of brick and random ashlar stone surrounded by twin stairways made of split logs that lead to the second floor guest rooms. The slogan “Charm of Yesterday, Convenience of Tomorrow” is rendered in neon above the main entrance.

It is on the Trails of the Ancients Byway, one of the designated New Mexico Scenic Byways.

History
It opened in 1937 as a base for movie productions. Employees were trained by the Fred Harvey Company.

With the opening of Interstate 40, the property fell into decline.
Armand Ortega bought the hotel at a bankruptcy auction and restored the property. The Ortega family has a long history dealing in Native American jewelry and artwork in Santa Fe, New Mexico and has operated concessions for the National Park Service at Carlsbad Caverns National Park, White Sands National Park, Death Valley National Park, Hawaiʻi Volcanoes National Park, Muir Woods National Monument, and others.

Famous guests

 Alan Ladd
 Barbara Peyton 
 Betty Grable 
 Betty Hutton 
 Bob Hutton 
 Broderick Crawford 
 Bruce Cabot 
 Burt Lancaster 
 Carl Kempton 
 Claude Akins 
 Dale Robertson 
 Dana Andrews 
 Dean Jagger 
 Dennis Morgan 
 Doris Day 
 Dorothy Malone 
 Elizabeth Scott 
 Errol Flynn 
 Forrest Tucker 
 Fred Mac Murray 
 Gene Autry 
 Gregory Peck 
 Howard Newsom 
 Humphrey Bogart 
 Ida Lupino 
 Irene Manning 
 Jack Benny 
 Jack Carson 
 Jack Oakie 
 Jackie Cooper
 James Cagney 
 Jan Sterling 
 Jane Fonda 
 Jane Wyman
 Jean Harlow 
 Jean Parker 
 Jeanne Kelly 
 Jimmy Stewart 
 Joan Crawford 
 Joel McCrea 
 John Forsyth 
 John Hodiak 
 John Wayne
 Jose Ferrer 
 Joseph Cotton 
 Katharine Hepburn
 Kirk Douglas
 Lee Marvin 
 Lee Remick 
 Lorraine Day 
 Lucille Ball 
 Mae West 
 Maria Montez 
 Marilyn Maxwell 
 Marx Brothers 
 Mona Freeman 
 Pat Wymore 
 Paulette Goddard 
 Peter Graves 
 Richard Boone 
 Rita Hayworth 
 Robert Mitchum 
 Robert Taylor 
 Ronald Reagan 
 Rosalind Russell 
 Ruth Hussey 
 Sidney Greenstreet 
 Spencer Tracy
 Susan Hayward 
 Susan Pleshette 
 Tom Mix 
 Troy Donahue 
 Tyrone Power 
 Virginia Mayo 
 W.C. Fields 
 Wallace Berry 
 William Bendix 
 William Bennett 
 William Holden 
 Xander Escamilla
 Zachary Scott

Headquarters for films

 The Bad Man 1940
 Sundown 1941
 The Desert Song 1942
 Song of the Nile 1944
 Four Faces West & Colorado Territory 1947-1948
 Streets of Laredo 1948
 Rocky Mountain 1950
 Ace in the Hole (1951 film) 1951 (AKA The Big Carnival)
 New Mexico 1950
 Fort Defiance 1950
 Raton Pass 1951
 Fort Massacre 1957
 A Distant Trumpet 1963
 The Hallelujah Trail 1964
 Bottom of the World 2017

See also

National Register of Historic Places listings in McKinley County, New Mexico
List of motels

References

External links

Historic El Rancho Hotel
El Rancho Hotel at About.com

Buildings and structures in McKinley County, New Mexico
Gallup, New Mexico
Hotel buildings on the National Register of Historic Places in New Mexico
Hotels established in 1937
Motels in the United States
U.S. Route 66 in New Mexico
Tourist attractions along U.S. Route 66
Tourist attractions in McKinley County, New Mexico
National Register of Historic Places in McKinley County, New Mexico
1937 establishments in New Mexico